The Women's 1m Springboard event was contested for the first time at the World Aquatics Championships during the 1991 edition, held in Perth, Western Australia.

The competition was split into two phases, with a preliminary round, where the twelve divers with the highest scores advanced to the final. In the last round divers performed a set of dives to determine the final ranking.

Final

Non-Qualifiers

See also
Diving at the 1988 Summer Olympics
Diving at the 1992 Summer Olympics

References
 2003 World Championships Team USA Media Guide

Diving at the 1991 World Aquatics Championships
Aqua